The Archer-Daniels-Midland Company, commonly known as ADM, is an American multinational food processing and commodities trading corporation founded in 1902 and headquartered in Chicago, Illinois. The company operates more than 270 plants and 420 crop procurement facilities worldwide, where cereal grains and oilseeds are processed into products used in food, beverage, nutraceutical, industrial, and animal feed markets worldwide.

ADM ranked No. 54 in the 2020 Fortune 500 list of the largest United States corporations.

The company also provides agricultural storage and transportation services. The American River Transportation Company along with ADM Trucking, Inc., are subsidiaries of ADM.

ADM has been the subject of significant media attention and infamy over the years with its various scandals, one inspiring a novel and subsequent film The Informant!.

History 
In 1902, George A. Archer and John W. Daniels started a linseed crushing business in Minneapolis, Minnesota. In 1923, Archer-Daniels Linseed Company acquired Midland Linseed Products Company, and the Archer Daniels Midland Company was formed. ADM expanded its agribusiness to include milling, processing, specialty food ingredients, and cocoa. In 1924 ADM was listed on the New York Stock Exchange.

ADM purchased control of the flour milling company Commander-Larabee Corp. in 1930.

In 1969, ADM relocated its headquarters to Decatur, Illinois, where it remained for 45 years until moving to Chicago in 2014.

In 1970, Dwayne Andreas became the chief executive officer of ADM and is credited with transforming the firm into an industrial powerhouse. Andreas remained CEO until 1997 when his nephew, G. Allen Andreas, was named to the position. In 2001, Paul B. Mulhollem became the company's president. ADM was the first U.S. company to sign a contract with Cuba since the embargo against Cuba was imposed in October 1960.

In 1989, ADM purchased Collingwood Grain Inc. based in Hutchinson Kansas, adding 48 million bushels of grain storage at 36 terminal elevators.

In May 2006, Patricia A. Woertz became the company's chief executive officer. In February 2007, Woertz was elected chairman of the board at ADM. 

In 2012, the company sought to acquire strategic holdings to support serving Asian markets through the acquisition of GrainCorp, an Australian grain firm with a network of storage and port facilities in Australia. On November 29, 2013, this acquisition was blocked by the Australian Treasurer.

On July 7, 2014, the company announced that it would buy Swiss-German natural ingredient company Wild Flavors for $3 billion, a move aimed at diversifying the company and helping brands appeal to consumers who increasingly favor foods with natural ingredients and flavorings.

The appointment of current CEO Juan R. Luciano was announced on November 5, 2014. Luciano joined the company in 2011 as executive vice president and chief operating officer and became president in February 2014. He succeeded Patricia Woertz as CEO in January 2015, and as chairman of the board in January 2016.

In October 2015, ADM announced the sale of its global cocoa business to Olam International. The sale was valued at about $1.2 billion. Approximately 1,500 employees transferred to Olam with the sale. In January 2017, ADM agreed to sell its crop risk services (insurance) unit to Validus Holdings for $127.5 million. 

On January 19, 2018, it was reported that Archer Daniels Midland Co. (ADM) had approached Bunge Ltd. about a takeover, with details "unclear". At that point, Bunge had a market value of about $9.8 billion, and was also being pursued by Glencore PLC for acquisition, since May 2017. In 2018 ADM agreed to purchase the British probiotic supplement company Probiotics International Limited for $243 million. In 2019, ADM agreed to purchase the remaining 50 percent stake in British grain and oilseed producer Gleadell from the French company InVivo, and completed the acquisition of animal nutrition company Neovia for $1.54 billion euros (US$1.73 billion).

Environmental record 

The company has been the subject of several major federal lawsuits related to air pollution. In 2001, it agreed to pay a $1.46 million fine for violating federal and Illinois clean-air regulations at its Decatur feed plant and to spend $1.6 million to reduce air pollution there. 
In 2003, the company settled federal air pollution complaints related to its efforts to avoid New Source Review provisions of the Clean Air Act that require pollution control upgrades when a plant is modernized. The company paid $4.5 million in penalties and more than $6 million to support environmental projects. In addition, ADM agreed to eliminate more than 60,000 tons of emissions of carbon monoxide, particulate matter, volatile organic compounds, and other pollutants from 42 plants in 17 states, at a cost of hundreds of millions of dollars.

In an attempt to reduce its carbon footprint, the company has partnered with the Midwest Geological Sequestration Association and other organizations to test the disposal of carbon dioxide emissions underground. If testing is successful, beginning in late 2010 the company expected to dispose of 1,000 metric tons per day of carbon dioxide emissions currently being released to the atmosphere.

Carbon footprint
ADM reported Total CO2e emissions (Direct + Indirect) for the twelve months ending 31 December 2020 at 16,230 Kt (-1,570 /-8.8% y-o-y). ADM plans to reduce emissions 25% by 2035 from a 2019 base year.

Products
Products include oils and meal from soybeans, cottonseed, sunflower seeds, canola, peanuts, flaxseed, Palm kernel, and DAG oil, as well as corn germ, corn gluten feed pellets, syrup, starch, glucose, dextrose, crystalline dextrose, high fructose corn syrup sweeteners, chocolate, ethanol, and wheat flour. End uses are consumption by people, livestock, and additives for fuel. In January 2008, ADM signed a three-year memorandum of understanding with Daimler AG and Bayer CropScience to explore the use of jatropha as a feedstock for biofuel. Natural flavors were added to ADM's product portfolio with the 2014 acquisition of Wild Flavors and vanilla products were added through the acquisition of Rodelle in 2018. 

Long known as a food and ingredients company, it has also invested in fuel production. ADM nearly doubled capital spending in its 2007 budget to an estimated $1.12 billion. The increase is planned for bioenergy projects, focusing on bioethanol and biodiesel.

Oilseeds processing
The oilseeds processing segment includes global activities related to the origination, merchandising, crushing, and further processing of oilseeds such as soybeans and soft seeds (cottonseed, sunflower seed, canola, and flaxseed) into vegetable oils and protein meals.

The first quarter of 2020, during the COVID-19 pandemic, saw the operating profit of Ag Services and Oilseeds (ADM's biggest revenue segment) rise $422 million, or 1.2%.

Corn processing
ADM's corn processing segment is engaged in corn wet milling and dry milling activities, with its asset base primarily located in the central part of the United States. The Corn Processing segment converts corn into sweeteners and starches, and bioproducts. Its products include ingredients used in the food and beverage industry including sweeteners, starch, syrup, glucose (dextrose). Dextrose and starch are used by the Corn Processing segment as feedstocks for its bioproducts operations. In 2021, ADM was ranked second on the Top 50 Global Sweetener Companies list by FoodTalks.

Agricultural services

ADM's agricultural services segment uses its U.S. grain elevator, global transportation network, and port operations to buy, store, clean, and transport agricultural commodities, such as oilseeds, corn, wheat, milo, oats, rice, and barley, and resells these commodities primarily as food and feed ingredients and as raw materials for the agricultural processing industry.

Investor services
ADM investor services, Inc. is a registered futures commission merchant and a clearing member of all principal commodities exchanges in the U.S. ADM Investor Services International, Ltd., a member of commodity exchanges and clearing houses in Europe, and ADMIS Hong Kong Limited, offer broker services in Europe and Asia.

Scandals

Sherman antitrust violation
In 1920 the US Department of Justice brought suit against the National Linseed Oil Trust for violating the Sherman Antitrust Act. Several co-defendants were named, including the Archer-Daniels Manufacturing Company. The suit alleged all of these companies were acting in collusion to raise prices, citing a spike in linseed oil costs between 1916 and 1918, when the price rose from $.50 per gallon to $1.80.

Price fixing 

In 1993, the company was the subject of a lysine price-fixing investigation by the U.S. Justice Department. Senior ADM executives were indicted on criminal charges for engaging in price-fixing within the international lysine market. Three of ADM's top officials, including vice chairman Michael Andreas were eventually sentenced to federal prison in 1999. Moreover, in 1997, the company was fined $100 million, the largest antitrust fine in U.S. history at the time. Mark Whitacre, FBI informant and whistleblower of the lysine price-fixing conspiracy, would also find himself in legal trouble for embezzling money from ADM during his time as an informant for the FBI. In addition, according to ADM's 2005 annual report, a settlement was reached under which ADM paid $400 million in 2005 to settle a class action antitrust suit. The Informant is a nonfiction thriller book based on this event, which was later adapted into the 2009 film The Informant!.

Tax dodging 
A noteworthy case of transfer mispricing came to light in 2011 in Argentina involving the world's four largest grain traders: ADM, Bunge, Cargill and LDC. Argentina's revenue and customs service began an investigation into the four companies when prices for agricultural commodities spiked in 2008 and yet very little profit for the four companies had been reported to the office. As a result of the investigation, it was alleged that the companies had submitted false declarations of sales and routed profits through tax havens or through their headquarters. In some cases, they were said to have used phantom firms to buy grain and had inflated costs in Argentina in order to reduce the recorded profits earned in the country. According to the country's revenue and customs service, the outstanding taxes amounted to almost US$1 billion. The companies involved have denied the allegations. To date, the Argentinian tax authorities have not replied to the Swiss NGO Public Eye’s request regarding the current state of the case. In its 2018 annual report to the US Securities and Exchange Commission (SEC), Bunge mentioned provisions which suggest that the case is still ongoing: "[A]s of December 31, 2018, Bunge's Argentine subsidiary had received income tax assessments relating to 2006 through 2009 of approximately 1,276 million Argentine pesos (approximately $34 million), plus applicable interest on the outstanding amount of approximately 4,246 million Argentine pesos (approximately $113 million)."

Violation of the Foreign Corrupt Practices Act 
On December 20, 2013, the SEC announced that it had charged ADM for failing to prevent illicit payments (bribes) made by its foreign subsidiaries to Ukrainian government officials in violation of the FCPA. Alfred C. Toepfer International Ukraine Ltd. (ACTI Ukraine), plead guilty in the Central District of Illinois to one count of conspiracy in violation of the anti-bribery sections of the FCPA. They agreed to pay $17.8 million in fines. The Department of Justice also entered into a non-prosecution agreement with ADM due to the company's failure to implement a system of internal financial controls, addressing improper payments both in Ukraine and by an ADM joint venture in Venezuela. ADM agreed to pay more than $36 million to settle the SEC's charges, bringing the total amount paid to over $54 million.

The Swiss NGO Public Eye elaborated the case.

Agricultural subsidies
The company lobbies for agricultural subsidies and price supports including sugar and ethanol. According to a 1995 report by the libertarian think tank Cato Institute, "ADM has cost the American economy billions of dollars since 1980 and has indirectly cost Americans tens of billions of dollars in higher prices and higher taxes over that same period. At least 43 percent of ADM's annual profits are from products heavily subsidized or protected by the American government. Moreover, every $1 of profits earned by ADM's corn sweetener operation costs consumers $10, and every $1 of profits earned by its bioethanol operation costs taxpayers $30."

Sonny Perdue land sale 
In 2021, an investigation by the Washington Post found that ADM had sold land to incoming Secretary of Agriculture Sonny Perdue in 2017 at a fraction of its estimated value. Ethics lawyers had legal and ethical concerns about the sale, questioning whether it amounted to bribery. According to the Post, ADM "sold the land at a small fraction of its estimated value just as it stood to benefit from a friendly secretary of agriculture."

See also

 List of Illinois companies
 List of S&P 500 companies

References

External links
  

 
 

 
1902 establishments in Minnesota
Chemical companies of the United States
Food and drink companies established in 1902
Conglomerate companies established in 1902
Companies listed on the New York Stock Exchange
Decatur, Illinois
Food manufacturers of the United States
Grain companies of the United States
Price fixing convictions
Starch companies
Multinational food companies